Pi Alley (often misspelled Pie Alley) in Boston, Massachusetts is located off Washington Street, near the Old City Hall on School Street. The origin of the short street's name remains in question. It may be named after the pied type which newspaper composing rooms dumped into the alley in the past, or after the local restaurants that sold coffee and a piece of pie for a nickel. It is also known as Williams Court, Savage's Court, Peck's Arch, and Webster's Arch.

History
Through the years, tenants have included:

 The Bell-in-Hand (est. 1795) was "a faithful reproduction of the taverns fashionable in London" in the 18th century.
 Boston Herald
 Boston police (c. 1854), corner of Court Square and Williams Ct.
  Private residences in 1832 of a clerk, colorer, cordwainer, handcartman, housewright, mariner, nurse, truckman, wheelwright, and several laborers, printers, and widows
 David Francis (1779-1853), printer, publisher (Munroe & Francis)
 "Oakum pickers tenement" (c. 1711). "In 1711, Oct. 2, a fire commenced in Williams' Court in an oakum pickers tenement, where the woman suffered the fire 'to catch the oakum she was employed in picking of;' all the houses and stores on both sides of Washington St. between School St. and Dock Square were laid in ashes."
 Life in Boston, a weekly periodical (c. 1851)
 Samuel Sewall (c. 1727). "Monday, July 10th, 1727, removed with my family to Boston. Hired a house in Deacon Williams Court next house to Deacon Williams, N. Gates and N. Gleason, bringing my household stuff."

See also
 Newspaper Row (Boston)

References

External links

 Google news archive. Articles about Pi Alley; Pie Alley; Williams Court
 Flickr. Photo of Washington St. from the Pi Alley Garage, mid-1970s
 View East from Pi Alley, Boston, 2008, photo by Nicholas Nixon
 Flickr. Photo of Pi Alley, 2008
 Flickr. Photo of Pi Alley, 2008
 Flickr. Photo of Pi Alley, 2009
 Flickr. Photo of Pi Alley, 2010

History of Boston
Streets in Boston